Imperius Rex is the fourth solo studio album by American rapper Sean Price. It was released on August 8, 2017, via Duck Down Music, exactly two years after his death, making it his first posthumous release. It features guest appearances from Bernadette Price, Buckshot, Foul Monday, Freeway, Ike Eyez, Inspectah Deck, Junior Reid, Method Man, MF Doom, Prodigy, Raekwon, Rim P, Rock, Ruste Juxx, Smif-N-Wessun, Styles P and Vic Spencer.

Critical reception

Imperius Rex was met with positive reviews. At Metacritic, which assigns a normalized rating out of 100 to reviews from mainstream publications, the album received an average score of 87, based on four reviews. The aggregator Album of the Year has the critical consensus of the album at an 81 out of 100, based on four reviews.

Dana Scott of HipHopDX stated: "This is an impressive showcase for his fans". Chris Gibbons of XXL said: "Imperius Rex is a worthy entry into the Sean Price canon, and proof that his voice will still live on in hip-hop well after his untimely passing". AllMusic's Paul Simpson said: "Nobody on the album overshadows Price, who sounds as forceful, commanding, and even as funny as ever".

Accolades

Track listing

Charts

References

External links

2017 albums
Albums produced by the Alchemist (musician)
Albums produced by Harry Fraud
Albums produced by Nottz
Albums produced by Marco Polo
Sean Price albums
Duck Down Music albums
Albums published posthumously